The  is a rubber-tyred metro line in Sapporo, Hokkaido, Japan, operated by Sapporo City Transportation Bureau. It is part of the Sapporo Municipal Subway system. It runs from Sakaemachi Station in Higashi-ku to Fukuzumi Station in Toyohira-ku. The Tōhō Line color on maps is sky blue. Its stations are numbered with the prefix "H".

Station list
 All stations are located in Sapporo.
 The entire line is underground.

Rolling stock
 9000 series 4-car EMUs (since May 2015)

The first of a fleet of 20 new 9000 series four-car EMUs was introduced on the Tōhō Line in May 2015. Built by Kawasaki Heavy Industries in Kobe, the first trainset was unveiled to the media in November 2014. All 20 trains were scheduled to be in service by fiscal 2016, replacing the fleet of 7000 series trains.

Former rolling stock 
 7000 series 4-car EMUs (from 1988 until 2016)

From 1988 to 2016, the line was operated using a fleet of 20 four-car 7000 series EMUs (sets 7101 to 7120).
 The last 7000 series trains were withdrawn from service on June 25, 2016.

History
The Sakaemachi to Hōsui-Susukino section opened on December 2, 1988. The Hōsui-Susukino to Fukuzumi section opened on October 14, 1994.

Future developments
Platform edge doors are to be installed at all Tōhō Line stations by fiscal 2016.

References

External links

 Sapporo City Transportation Bureau 

Sapporo Municipal Subway
Rail transport in Hokkaido
Railway lines opened in 1988
1988 establishments in Japan